The Fletcher Foundation was a nonprofit foundation that supported civil rights, education, and environmental education.  The foundation supported efforts to develop a more just society with more equal opportunities for more of the population primarily by leveraging the financial and non-financial contributions of Fletcher Asset Management, the Fletcher Family including New York financier and philanthropist Alphonse Fletcher, Jr., and others. Fletcher Asset Management has been accused of fraud related to its management of funds and the value of pledges Fletcher's charitable pledges are in dispute. The Foundation lost its tax-exempt status in 2018.

A 1987 graduate of Harvard University, Fletcher worked in investment banking and in 1991 founded Fletcher Asset Management. A Harvard Class Marshal, Fletcher endowed a University Professorship at his alma mater, first held by philosopher Cornel West and now held by literary critic Henry Louis Gates, Jr. In 2004, in commemoration of the fiftieth anniversary of the landmark Supreme Court decision, Brown v. Board of Education, the Fletcher Foundation announced the creation of the Alphonse Fletcher, Sr. Fellowship program, described by foundation chair Henry Louis Gates, Jr. as "Guggenheims for race issues." The inaugural class of Fletcher Fellows, each awarded $50,000, was selected in 2006.

2005 Inaugural Fletcher Fellows 
Press release, Graywolf Press

Elizabeth Alexander, poet and African-American studies professor, Yale University
Devon Carbado, law professor at University of California, Los Angeles
Kathleen Cleaver, author and former Black Panther Party activist
Stanley Crouch, cultural critic and author
Roland Fryer, economist and member of Harvard Society of Fellows
Anita Hill, civil rights attorney and law professor Brandeis University 
Nina Jablonski, biological anthropologist and author of Skin
Glenn Ligon, artist, New York
Arthur Mitchell, founder of the Dance Theatre of Harlem
Bob Moses, educator and civil rights leader
Thomas Sugrue, civil rights historian and professor at University of Pennsylvania
Deborah Willis, photographer and documentarian and professor at New York University

2006 Fletcher Fellows 
Fletcher Fellows Press Release

Lawrence Bobo, race relations scholar and professor at Stanford University
Fatimah L.C. Jackson, professor of anthropology, University of Maryland
Randall Kennedy, professor of law, Harvard University
Miranda Massie, civil rights attorney, Detroit, Michigan
Lorna Simpson, artist, New York
Anna Deavere Smith, performance artist, actress, and University Professor, New York University
Valerie Smith, professor of English and director African-American Studies Program, Princeton University
Margaret Beale Spencer, professor of education, University of Pennsylvania
Brent Staples, award-winning journalist, The New York Times
Patricia Sullivan, associate professor of history, University of South Carolina
Loïc Wacquant, professor of sociology and boxer, University of California, Berkeley

2007 Fletcher Fellows 
Fletcher Fellows Press Release

Hilton Als, journalist and literary critic
Cheryl Finley, assistant professor of art history, Cornell University
Joy A. James, professor of Africana Studies, Williams College
Kenneth W. Mack, professor of law, Harvard University
Charles Payne, professor of sociology and education, Duke University

2008 Fletcher Fellows 

Clayborne Carson, professor of history, Stanford University
Kimberlé Crenshaw, professor of law, UCLA and Columbia Law School
Kellie Jones, associate professor of art history and archaeology, Columbia University
Stacy L. Leeds, professor of law, University of Kansas

2009 Fletcher Fellows 

Emily Bernard, associate professor of English, University of Vermont
Rachel Devlin, associate professor of history, Tulane University
Llewellyn M. Smith, filmmaker
Keivan G. Stassun, associate professor of physics and astronomy, Vanderbilt University

2010 Fletcher Fellows 

Mia Bay, associate professor of history, Rutgers University
Richard Thompson Ford, professor of law, Stanford University
Tyrone Forman, associate professor of sociology, Emory University

2011 Fletcher Fellows 

Ian Haney-López, professor of law, University of California, Berkeley
Sharon D. Raynor, associate professor of English, Johnson C. Smith University 
Daniel J. Sharfstein, associate professor of law, Vanderbilt University
Rachel Swarns, correspondent, The New York Times
Jonathan Holloway, professor of history and African American studies, Yale University

2012 Fletcher Fellows 

Jane Dailey, associate professor in the Department of History, the College, and the Law School University of Chicago Law School, University of Chicago
Trey Ellis, assistant professor at the School of the Arts, Columbia University School of the Arts, Columbia University
Rucker Johnson, associate professor, Goldman School of Public Policy, University of California, Berkeley

Further reading 
The Root, 21 June 2012 (article about 2012 Fletcher Fellowships)  
The Wall Street Journal, 15 April 2005 (article about Fletcher Fellowships)
Boston Globe, 20 May 2005 (article about Fletcher Fellowships)

External links
 Fletcher Foundation official website

Notes

Fellowships
Environmental education